José Soto may refer to:

 José Soto (Peruvian footballer) (born 1970), Peruvian football manager and player
 José Soto (Chilean footballer) (born 1986), Chilean footballer
 Jose Chemo Soto, mayor of Canóvanas, Puerto Rico
 José Luis Soto (1932–2006), Costa Rican footballer
 José Manuel Soto (born 1946), Costa Rican cyclist
 José Tous Soto (1874–1933), Puerto Rican politician 
 José Soto Martínez (born 1946), Mexican politician
 José Soto (footballer, born 2002), Peruvian footballer